The Billies Bay Wilderness is part of Ocala National Forest. The  wilderness was established on September 28, 1984. The mostly marshy and swampy nature of the area is indicated by the word 'bay' as part of the name, since this is a Floridian term for swamp. It contributes to the headwaters of Alexander Springs Creek in the nearby Alexander Springs Wilderness.

Flora
Plants in the area include red maple, bay, sweet gum, cabbage palm, sand live oak (Quercus geminata), sandhill oak (Quercus inopina), myrtle oak (Quercus myrtifolia), Chapman's oak (Quercus chapmanii), palmetto, gallberry, longleaf, loblolly pine, slash and sand pine.

External links
 Billies Bay Wilderness at Wildernet
 Billies Bay Wilderness - official site at Ocala National Forest

IUCN Category Ib
Protected areas of Lake County, Florida
Wilderness areas of Florida
Ocala National Forest